Elective Affinities is an 1809 novel by Johann Wolfgang von Goethe.

Elective Affinities also may refer to:
 Elective Affinities (Magritte) (1933), painting by René Magritte
 Elective Affinities (film) (1974), East German film directed by Siegfried Kühn
 The Elective Affinities (1996), Italian film directed by Paolo and Vittorio Taviani
 Elective Affinities (Adjmi) (2005),  theater monologue by David Adjmi